Willoughby, British Columbia is a community located within the Township of Langley. It is also home to the Township of Langley's municipal hall.

Education
Served by School District 35 Langley, Willoughby has four elementary schools, two middle school and one high school; Richard Bulpitt Elementary School, Willoughby Elementary School, Langley Meadows Elementary School, Lynn Fripps Elementary, RC Garnet Elementary, Yorkson Creek Middle School, Peter Ewart Middle School, and R.E. Mountain Secondary School.

Neighbourhoods in Langley, British Columbia
Populated places in Greater Vancouver
Langley, British Columbia (district municipality)